Marco Palermo (born 1 November 1995) is an Italian professional footballer who plays as a midfielder for  club Catania.

Club career
Born in Catania, Palermo started his career on amateur level. He joined Siracusa for 2014-15 season, and won three consecutive promotion with the club, from Eccellenza to Serie C. He made his professional debut on 5 March 2017 against Vibonese.

On 8 September 2020, he joined Serie C club Pergolettese. On 31 January 2022, his contract with Pergolettese was terminated by mutual consent.

On 3 February 2022, he signed for Latina Calcio.

References

External links
 
 

1995 births
Living people
Footballers from Catania
Footballers from Sicily
Italian footballers
Association football midfielders
Serie C players
Serie D players
Eccellenza players
A.S. Siracusa players
A.S.D. Sicula Leonzio players
U.S. Pergolettese 1932 players
Latina Calcio 1932 players
Catania S.S.D. players